Ren Xi (born 20 February 2001), known internationally as Ren Qian, is a Chinese diver. She won a silver medal in the women's 10 m platform at the 2015 World Aquatics Championships, and then followed it with a gold at the 2016 Summer Olympics in Rio de Janeiro, becoming the youngest champion to top the podium (aged 15).

Ren was selected to the Chinese diving squad for the 2016 Summer Olympics in Rio de Janeiro, competing individually in the women's 10 m platform. There, she comfortably claimed the gold with a total score of 439.25, making her the youngest champion at the Games and the only one from the championship field to tally more than 90 points on a single dive.

See also
China at the 2015 World Aquatics Championships

References

Chinese female divers
Living people
Sportspeople from Chengdu
2001 births
World Aquatics Championships medalists in diving
Divers at the 2016 Summer Olympics
Olympic divers of China
2016 Olympic gold medalists for China
Olympic medalists in diving
21st-century Chinese women